Pedro Saúl Morales (1 October 1959 – 24 March 2021) was a Colombian racing cyclist. He rode in seven Grand Tours between 1987 and 1991.

He died on 24 March 2021 from a cardiac arrest.

References

External links
 

1959 births
2021 deaths
Colombian male cyclists
Sportspeople from Boyacá Department
20th-century Colombian people